Middle-earth Role Playing (MERP) is a 1984 role-playing game based on J. R. R. Tolkien The Lord of the Rings and The Hobbit under license from Tolkien Enterprises. Iron Crown Enterprises (I.C.E.) published the game until they lost the license on 22 September 1999.

System

The rules system of the game is a streamlined version of I.C.E.'s generic fantasy RPG, Rolemaster.

Characters have Attributes and Skills rated between 1 and 100 on a percentile die (d100) or two ten-sided dice (2d10). Skills can be modified to a rating above or below these limits (i.e. under 1 or over 100, with open-ended MERP options to add or subtract additional d100). An attack roll consists of a percentile roll, to which the attacker's skill rating and appropriate attribute rating are added and the defender's dodge rating is subtracted. The result is compared to the defender's armor type and looked up on a table to determine success or failure. A separate critical table is used in the initial chart result called for it.

Spellcasters learn lists of ten spells as a unit. Each of the spells is based on a theme (e.g. healing spells).

History
I.C.E. published the first edition of MERP ruleset in 1984 and a second edition in 1986. A collector's edition was published in 1993, based upon the second edition with twice the number of pages. I.C.E. was working on the third edition that was never published, along with many adventure and campaign modules, until Tolkien Enterprises revoked the license for games based on The Hobbit and The Lord of the Rings in 1999. I.C.E. declared bankruptcy in 2000.

A related quarterly magazine, Other Hands Magazine created by Professor Chris Seeman, supporting the MERP community, was also sent a desist by Tolkien Enterprises and ceased publication in 2001.

A second magazine named Other Minds Magazine created by Hawke Robinson, (named in recognition of the previous Other Hands quarterly, both about a quote from J. R. R. Tolkien's Letters) began publication in 2007. It also supports the role-playing community using ICE's MERP, Decipher's LotR, Cubicle 7's The One Ring Roleplaying Game, and other Tolkien-centric role-playing game systems.

In 1991-1993, I.C.E. also published the Lord of the Rings Adventure Game. It used a simpler system than MERP and was intended to introduce new players to role-playing.

A UK edition was published by Games Workshop in 1985. It featured the First Edition rules, with a new box and booklet art by Chris Achilleos, along with 25mm floorplans for the sample adventure. Both the first and second edition ruleset and most of the adventure modules were translated for a German edition as Mittelerde-Rollenspiel (MERS) by Citadel Verlag, later Laurin Verlag, later Queen Games, starting in 1987. In Sweden a translated version called Sagan om Ringen: Rollspelet was released in 1986 by Target Games, followed by several translated modules. In Japan a translated version was released in 1987 by Hobby Japan. A Finnish language edition (Keski-Maa Roolipeli or KERP) was published in 1990. The first and second edition ruleset were translated for a French edition as Jeu de rôle des Terres du Milieu (JRTM) by Hexagonal, starting in 1986.

In the summer of 2005, a new annual convention began known as Merpcon (Middle-earth Role Playing Convention). It initially used the ICE MERP and ICE Rolemaster role-playing game systems.

Supplements

1st edition MERP supplements
Angmar: Land of the Witch King (1982)
A Campaign and Adventure Guidebook for Middle-earth (1982)
Umbar: Haven of the Corsairs (1982)
The Court of Ardor in Southern Middle Earth (1983)
Isengard and Northern Gondor (1983)
Northern Mirkwood: The Wood-Elves Realm (1983)
Southern Mirkwood: Haunt of the Necromancer (1983)
Bree and the Barrow-Downs (1984)
Combat Screen and Reference Sheets (1984)
Dagorlad and the Dead Marshes (1984)
Hillmen of the Trollshaws (1984)
Moria: The Dwarven City (1984)
The Tower of Cirith Ungol and Shelob's Lair (1984)
Erech and the Paths of the Dead (1985)
Goblin-Gate and Eagle's Eyrie (1985)
Haunted Ruins of the Dundlendings (1985)
Moria, the Dwarven City (1985)
Rangers of the North: The Kingdom of Arthedain (1985)
Riders of Rohan (1985)
Lords of Middle-earth, Volume I (1986)
Lórien & The Halls of the Elven Smiths (1986)
Phantom of the Northern Marches (1986)
Thieves of Tharbad (1986)
Trolls of the Misty Mountains (1986)
Assassins of Dol Amroth (1987)
Brigands of Mirkwood (1987)
Dunland and the Southern Misty Mountains (1987)
Ents of Fangorn (1987)
Gates of Mordor (1987)
Havens of Gondor ... Land of Belfalas (1987)
Lords of Middle-earth, Volume II (1987)
Lost Realm of Cardolan (1987)
Pirates of Pelargir (1987)
Rivendell: The House of Elrond (1987)
Sea-Lords of Gondor ... Pelargir and Lebennin (1987)
Weathertop, Tower of the Wind (1987)
Woses of the Black Wood (1987)
Creatures of Middle-earth: A Bestiary of Animals and Monsters (1988)
Far Harad, the Scorched Land (1988)
Halls of the Elven-King (1988)
Minas Tirith (1988)
Mirkwood: The Wilds of Rhovanion (1988)
Mouths of the Entwash (1988)
Raiders of Cardolan (1988)
Shadow in the South (1988)
Teeth of Mordor (1988)
Dark Mage of Rhudaur (1989)
Denizens of the Dark Wood (1989)
Empire of the Witch-King (1989)
Forest of Tears (1989)
Ghosts of the Southern Anduin (1989)
Lords of Middle-earth, Volume III (1989)
Middle-earth Adventure Guidebook II (1989)
Mount Gundabad (1989)
Perils on the Sea of Rhûn (1989)
Treasures of Middle-Earth (1989)
Warlords of the Desert (1989)
Angus McBride's Characters of Middle-earth (1990)
Calenhad, a Beacon of Gondor (1990)
Ghost Warriors (1990)
Gorgoroth (1990)
Greater Harad (1990)
Hazards of the Harad Wood (1990)
Rogues of the Borderlands (1990)
The Necromancer's Lieutenant (1990)
Minas Ithil (1991)
Nazgul's Citadel (1991)
River Running (1992)
The Grey Mountains (1992)
Palantir Quest (1994)
Kin-Strife (1995)
Hands of the Healer (1997)

2nd edition MERP supplements
 Southern Gondor: The Land
 A sourcebook that describes the coastal provinces of Gondor in detail, and was designed to complement Southern Gondor: The People.
 Andy Butcher reviewed Southern Gondor: The People for Arcane magazine, rating it a 6 out of 10 overall. Butcher comments that "Combined with Southern Gondor: The People, there's more than enough background here for the referee to become an expert on every aspect of the area. Just how useful a lot of this detail is in gaming terms is somewhat debatable, although there's no denying that if it's authenticity you're after, you'll find it here."

Critical reaction
In the February 1984 edition of White Dwarf (Issue 50), Jonathan Sutherland reviewed the various MERP supplements available at the time, and generally liked them, although he found their price a bit steep.

A few issues later, in the October 1984 edition of White Dwarf (Issue 58), Sutherland reviewed the main rules system of MERP and thought that it "mirrors the consistently high-quality one has come to expect from ICE." Sutherland concluded that it "is a well-conceived, reasonably well-written system. I can't say it's easy and ideal for beginners but I can honestly recommend that you try it. MERP gets my vote as best new RPG this year; in fact I've not been so impressed since I first read Call of Cthulhu."

In the March–April 1985 edition of Space Gamer (Issue No. 73),  William A. Barton commented that "If you haven't yet taken a trip to Middle-earth via the Iron Crown, I recommend you remedy the situation as soon as possible."
 
In the January 1985 edition of Imagine (Issue 22), Andy Blakeman stated that "by its links with Tolkein, it cannot fail to attract many new gamers into this hobby; and I am reasonably confident that these newcomers will not be disappointed."

In the June 1985 edition of White Dwarf (Issue 66), Graham Staplehurst thought "Iron Crown has done superb development work on areas that Tolkien neglected or left unspecified." He found the rules system suitable "though not spectacularly original", and the combat system "can be rather bloody, which is no bad thing." However Staplehurst had issues with the magic system, pointing out that in Tolkien's books, magic is a rare, subtle force only used by a few powerful characters, whereas "The MERP system gives these sorts of powers to almost anyone after the acquisition of relatively few experience points; for me, it upsets the flavor of the game and its authenticity." He concluded, "MERP can be used to recreate the great adventures of which Tolkien wrote: going with Frodo or Bilbo or Beren into the lair of evil and trying to escape alive, and it can go some way to fulfilling the desires of people who want to know more about Tolkien's world."

In the January 1987 edition of White Dwarf (Issue 83), Graham Staplehurst reviewed the second edition of the rules and applauded ICE for including more material for newcomers, such as an introductory booklet and a short introductory adventure. He also liked the rearrangement of rules, pointing out that "Much of the confusion of tables, lists, and rules has been cleared by a sensible grouping of charts onto single pages and into a larger batch on the rear of the book." He concluded, "MERP remains (for me) one of the more inventive and enjoyable roleplaying game currently available."

In a 1996 readers poll taken by Arcane magazine to determine the 50 most popular roleplaying games of all time, Middle-earth Role Playing was ranked 11th. Editor Paul Pettengale commented: "The popularity of the books, we would suggest, explains why the game based on Tolkien's world is so popular. The system is overly complicated (being based on the complex Rolemaster system - see number 15), and it suffers from the problem of timing. For example, at which time do you set your campaign? Set it before The Lord of the Rings and everyone knows what's going to happen, set it after The Lord of the Rings and you've got to make a whole load of stuff up. Still, the supplements are all good, if you get off on bucketfuls of detail and polished prose. Not for everyone, sure, but die-hard Tolkien fans should check it out."

Reviews
Different Worlds #46 (May/June, 1987)
White Wolf #49 (Nov., 1994)
 Casus Belli #24 (Feb 1985)
 Casus Belli #36 (Feb 1987)
Asimov's Science Fiction v8 n11 (1984 11)

References

External links
MERP information site
I.C.E.'s MERP page

 
Fantasy role-playing games
Iron Crown Enterprises games
Role-playing games based on Middle-earth
 Role-playing games introduced in 1984